100% Hits: Best of 2003 is a 2-disc compilation album released by EMI Music Australia and Warner Music Australia.  The album was the #18 compilation album on the 2003 year-end charts in Australia. The album was certified platinum in Australia.

Track listing

Disc 1
Stacie Orrico – "Stuck" (3:42)
Chingy – "Right Thurr" (3:37)
Madonna – "American Life" (4:27)
The Androids – "Do It with Madonna" (3:48)
Amanda Perez – "Angel" (3:38)
Kylie Minogue – "Come into My World" (4:05)
Sean Paul – "Get Busy" (3:31)
Hilary Duff – "Why Not" (2:59)
Dannii Minogue – "I Begin to Wonder" (3:40)
Snoop Dogg featuring Pharrell and Uncle Charlie Wilson – "Beautiful" (3:21)
Missy Elliott featuring Ludacris – "Gossip Folks" (Fatboy Slim Radio Remix) (3:30)
Sophie Monk – "Get the Music On" (3:43)
Atomic Kitten – "Be with You" (3:35)
Bec Cartwright – "On the Borderline" (3:20)
Mis-Teeq – "Scandalous" (Stargate Radio Mix) (3:58)
Disco Montego – "U Talkin' to Me" (5:11)
The Sound Bluntz – "Billie Jean" (4:01)
Who Da Funk featuring Jessica Eve – "Shiny Disco Balls" (3:14)
Craig David – "World Filled with Love" (3:44)
Wayne Wonder – "No Letting Go" (3:22)
Liam Lynch – "United States of Whatever" (1:28)

Disc 2
Silverchair – "Across the Night" (5:34)
Jewel – "Intuition" (3:48)
Alex Lloyd – "Coming Home" (3:07)
Michelle Branch – "Are You Happy Now?" (3:50)
Emmanuel Carella – "Don't Say a Word" (3:20)
Amiel – "Lovesong" (3:30)
Robbie Williams – "Come Undone" (4:38)
Coldplay – "Clocks" (4:11)
Jason Mraz – "The Remedy (I Won't Worry)" (4:13)
Matchbox Twenty – "Unwell" (3:49)
The Superjesus – "Stick Together" (4:14)
Hot Action Cop – "Fever for the Flava" (4:09)
The Music – "The People" (4:59)
The Dandy Warhols – "We Used to Be Friends" (3:20)
Jack Johnson – "The Horizon Has Been Defeated" (2:33)
Ben Harper – "Diamonds On the Inside" (3:40)
The Whitlams – "Don't Believe Anymore" (5:25)
David Gray – "Be Mine" (4:21)
Michael Bublé – "Kissing a Fool" (4:34)

References

External links
 100% Hits: Best Of 2003

2003 compilation albums
EMI Records compilation albums
2003 in Australian music